Yelena Borisovna Yelesina (born April 4, 1970) is a Russian female high jumper. She won the gold medal at the 2000 Summer Olympics with 2,01m, one centimetre behind her personal best jump. She also won several other medals outside her Olympic gold.

International competitions
All results regarding high jump.

See also
List of Olympic medalists in athletics (women)
List of 2000 Summer Olympics medal winners
List of ties for medals at the Olympics
List of World Athletics Championships medalists (women)
List of IAAF World Indoor Championships medalists (women)
List of European Athletics Championships medalists (women)
List of European Athletics Indoor Championships medalists (women)
List of high jump national champions (women)
List of Russian sportspeople
List of people from Chelyabinsk
High jump at the Olympics
High jump at the World Championships in Athletics

References

1970 births
Living people
Sportspeople from Chelyabinsk
Soviet female high jumpers
Russian female high jumpers
Olympic female high jumpers
Olympic athletes of Russia
Olympic gold medalists for Russia
Olympic gold medalists in athletics (track and field)
Athletes (track and field) at the 2000 Summer Olympics
Medalists at the 2000 Summer Olympics
Goodwill Games medalists in athletics
Competitors at the 1990 Goodwill Games
World Athletics Championships athletes for the Soviet Union
World Athletics Championships athletes for Russia
World Athletics Championships medalists
European Athletics Championships medalists
Russian Athletics Championships winners